The 2010 Archery World Cup was the 5th edition of the annual international archery circuit, organised by the World Archery Federation.

Competition rules and scoring
The compound legs consisted of a 50m qualification round of 72 arrows, followed by the compound round at 50m on a 6-zone target face, using cumulative scoring for all individual, team and mixed competitions. The top seven individual performers (with no more than two from each country,) plus one host nation representative if not already qualified, proceeded to the finals; the top mixed team performer proceeded to face the host nation at the finals, which were the same competition format as the legs. The team competition was not competed at the finals.

The recurve legs consisted of a FITA qualification round, followed by a 72m Olympic set system. The top seven individual performers (with no more than two from each country), plus one host nation representative if not already qualified, proceeded to the finals; the top mixed team performer proceeded to face the host nation at the finals, which were the same competition format as the legs. The team competition was not competed at the finals.

Competitors' top three scores go towards qualification. The scores awarded in the legs were as follows:

Individual scoring

Mixed team scoring

Calendar

Results

Recurve

Men's individual

Women's individual

Men's team

Women's team

Mixed team

Compound

Men's individual

Women's individual

Men's team

Women's team

Mixed team

Medals table

Qualification

Recurve

Men's individual

1. Could not qualify as national quota already reached

Women's individual

1. Could not qualify as national quota already reached 
2. Qualified but withdrew

Mixed team

Compound

Men's individual

1. Could not qualify as national quota already reached

Women's individual

1. Could not qualify as national quota already reached

Mixed team

Nations ranking

World Cup Final

Recurve

Men's individual

Women's individual

Mixed team

Compound

Men's individual

Women's individual

Mixed team

References

World
Archery World Cup
2010 in Turkish sport
International archery competitions hosted by Turkey
Sport in Antalya
21st century in Antalya
International archery competitions hosted by Croatia
International archery competitions hosted by the United States
2010 in Croatian sport
2010 in American sports